Miliard w rozumie (Billion in mind) is a Polish game show, produced by TVP3 Kraków under license of Polish Scientific Publishers PWN, transmitted in TVP1 from 1993 to 2005. Show was hosted by Janusz Weiss. Questions concern 54 difficulty disciplines.

Originally 16 contestants in four groups take part in game show once a year. Two best contestants in group were promoted to next stage. In final winner got remaining 75,000 for main reward - one hundred thousand Polish zlotys (title one billion zlotys after redenomination in 1995).

Later rules were changing –  winner take part in next stage (maximum 5 times) and accumulate money but in single stage could win more than earlier reward.

1993 Polish television series debuts
2005 Polish television series endings
Polish game shows
1990s Polish television series
2000s Polish television series
Telewizja Polska original programming